The Priest from Kirchfeld (German:Der Pfarrer von Kirchfeld) is a 1914 Austrian silent film directed by Jacob Fleck and Luise Fleck and starring Max Neufeld, Hans Rhoden and Polly Janisch. It is based on the play Der Pfarrer von Kirchfeld by Ludwig Anzengruber.

Cast
 Max Neufeld as Pfarrer Hell  
 Hans Rhoden as Wurzensepp  
 Polly Janisch as Anna Birkmeier  
 Lilly Karoly 
 Eugen Neufeld 
 Ludwig Trautmann as Der Pfarrer

References

Bibliography
 Goble, Alan. The Complete Index to Literary Sources in Film. Walter de Gruyter, 1999.

External links

1914 films
Films directed by Luise Fleck
Films directed by Jacob Fleck
Austrian silent feature films
Austrian films based on plays
Films based on works by Ludwig Anzengruber
Films about Catholic priests
Films set in the Alps
Austrian black-and-white films
Austro-Hungarian films